Jesper Leerdam (born 17 April 1987 in Hook of Holland) is a Dutch footballer currently playing for Dayton Dutch Lions in the USL Professional Division. He plays now for Excelsior Maassluis.

Career

Netherlands
Leerdam played extensively at all levels of the Dutch football system, having played for VV Hoek van Holland, RKVV Westlandia, ADO Den Haag, Vitesse Delft, 's-Gravenzandse SV and vv Capelle.

United States
Leerdam moved to the United States in 2011 to play for the Dayton Dutch Lions in the USL Professional Division in 2011.

References

External links
 Dayton Dutch Lions profile

1987 births
Living people
Dutch footballers
Dayton Dutch Lions players
People from Hook of Holland
Excelsior Maassluis players
RKVV Westlandia players
VV Capelle players
ADO Den Haag players
Association football goalkeepers
Footballers from South Holland